"One for the Money" is an English-language children's rhyme. Children have used it as early as the 1820s to count before starting a race or other activity.

The full rhyme reads as:
One for the money,
Two for the show;
Three to make ready,
And four to go.

In popular music
The rhyme has been used or interpolated in popular music since the 1950s. The earliest known song to contain the rhyme's lyrics is "Rock Around the Clock" by Hal Singer in 1950. Other early examples are in the intros of "Whatcha Gonna Do" by Bill Haley & His Comets from 1953 and "Roll Hot Rod Roll" by Oscar McLollie and "Blue Suede Shoes" by Carl Perkins, both from 1955. The latter was further popularized in a version by Elvis Presley released in March 1956 on his eponymous debut album. Since then, many other artists have interpolated the rhyme's lyrics in their songs, mainly in hip hop music, notably "Spoonin' Rap" by Spoonie Gee, "Jussummen" by Das EFX, "Bomdigi" by Erick Sermon, "Elevators (Me & You)" by Outkast, "Anything Goes" by Ras Kass and "Go to Church" by Ice Cube. In pop music, the lyric appears in Taylor Swift's "Champagne Problems" and Lana Del Rey's "Million Dollar Man". The phrase was also used as the title and in the main hook, with altered lyrics, for the song "One for the Money" by American rock band Escape the Fate.

References 

English children's songs
English folk songs
Counting-out rhymes